HMS Grampus (S04) was a Porpoise-class submarine. Her keel was laid down in 1955 by Cammell Laird at Birkenhead. She was launched by Lady Shepheard on 30 May 1957. She was first commissioned on 19 December 1958.

Service
On 1 April 1963, Grampus returned to Gosport after spending three weeks under the polar icecap looking for holes in the ice. During the patrol she superficially damaged her hull on the ice. During 1965 she refitted in Devonport Dockyard.

On 11 January 1968, the French trawler Fomalhaut caught Grampus in her nets in the English Channel. Grampus surfaced and both crews spent over three hours disentangling the nets. In 1968 she was part of the First Submarine Squadron based at HMS Dolphin and in that year was present during 'Navy Days' in Portsmouth Dockyard.

Grampus operated with USS Tigrone in a joint American-British oceanographic operation in the eastern Atlantic in 1972.

Grampus sank on 18 September 1980 in Loch Fyne as she was being towed as a sonar target.  She sits upright in 120 metres of water.

Commanding officers

References

Publications

 

British Porpoise-class submarines
Ships built on the River Mersey
1957 ships